Yvonne Wood (September 27, 1914 — January 14, 1999) was an American costume designer. She began her career at 20th Century Fox in 1943.

Filmography 

as Costume Designer:
Zoot Suit (1981)
Quincy M.E. (1980) (TV)
Captain America II (1979) (TV)
Operation Petticoat (1979) (TV)
B. J. and the Bear (1979) (TV)
Black Beauty (1978) (TV)
Harold Robbins' 79 Park Avenue (1977) (TV)
The Oregon Trail (1977) (TV)
Exo-Man (1977) (TV)
The Rhinemann Exchange (1977) (TV)
Delvecchio (1976) (TV)
Baa Baa Black Sheep (1976) (TV)
The Return of a Man Called Horse (1976)
Night of Terror (1972) (TV)
Dirty Dingus Magee (1970)
The Cheyenne Social Club (1970) 
The Good Guys and the Bad Guys (1969)
Guns for San Sebastian (1968)
Firecreek (1968)
Duel at Diablo (1966)
Arrest and Trial (1963) (TV)
One-Eyed Jacks (1961)
The Big Country (1958)
Man of the West (1958)
The Court Jester (1955)
Casanova's Big Night (1954)
Red Garters (1954)
Fort Algiers (1953)
Raiders of the Seven Seas (1953)
Botany Bay (1952)
Captive Women (1952)
Lady in the Iron Mask (1952) 
Double Crossbones (1950)
Trípoli (1950)
Shakedown (1950) 
Winchester '73 (1950)
Sierra (1950)
Comanche Territory (1950)
Buccaneer's Girl (1950)
Bagdad (1949)
Abandoned (1949)
The Gal Who Took the West (1949)
Calamity Jane and Sam Bass (1949)
Illegal Entry (1949)
Criss Cross (1949)
An Act of Murder (1948)
Mexican Hayride (1948)
Tap Roots 
River Lady (1948)
Another Part of the Forest (1948)
Casbah (1948)
Black Bart (1948)
Ride the Pink Horse (1947)
Slave Girl (1947)
The Web (1947)
Buck Privates Come Home (1947)
Song of Scheherazade (1947)
Swell Guy (1946)
White Tie and Tails (1946)
Johnny Comes Flying Home (1946)
Doll Face (1945)
They Were Expendable (1945)
A Bell for Adano (1945)
Don Juan Quilligan (1945)
Molly and Me (1945)
Circumstantial Evidence (1945)
Thunderhead, Son of Flicka (1945)
Something for the Boys (1944)
Greenwich Village (1944)
The Big Noise (1944)
Sweet and Low-Down (1944)
Bermuda Mystery (1944)
Tampico (1944)
Four Jills in a Jeep (1944)
The Purple Heart (1944)
The Gang's All Here (1943)

Notable design projects

References

External links 
 

American costume designers
Women costume designers
1914 births
1999 deaths
Artists from Los Angeles
People from Hollywood, Los Angeles